The Paxton Boys were Pennsylvania's most aggressive colonists, according to historian Kevin Kenny. While not many specifics are known about the individuals in the group, their overall profile is clear. The Paxton Boys lived in hill country northwest of Lancaster County and across the Susquehanna River in Cumberland County. Due to their westward position, they were considered the frontier at the time and consistently targeted during Indian wars and conflicts. Due to the lack of support from the local provincial government, the Paxton Boys formed a vigilante group in 1763 to defend themselves during the French and Indian War and Pontiac's War. Using their Presbyterianism faith, the Paxton Boys' leadership declared that Native Americans were "Cainites" (a Biblical representation of evil) and believed that they needed to be destroyed. The Paxton Boys did not limit their hate to Native tribes but also “Whites, Quakers, and German Moravians, when they believed that these groups too jeopardized the security of the backcountry.” This group also became known for attacking the Susquehannock tribe during an event known as the Conestoga Massacre. Following attacks on the Conestoga, in January 1764 about 250 Paxton Boys marched on Philadelphia to demonstrate their anger at the legislature. Met by leaders in Germantown, they agreed to disperse on the promise by Benjamin Franklin to provide their grievances a hearing in the legislature.

Attack on Susquehannock

Background 
In the aftermath of the French and Indian War, no Europeans had yet settled in the frontier of Pennsylvania. A new wave of Scots-Irish immigrants encroached on Native American land in the backcountry, often in blatant violation of previously signed treaties. These settlers claimed that Indians often raided their homes. Reverend John Elder, who was the parson at Paxtang, became a leader of the settlers. He was known as the "Fighting Parson" and kept his rifle in the pulpit while he delivered his sermons. During Pontiac's war in 1763, John Elder was given command of 110 men named the Paxton Boys or Paxtang Boys to defend the frontier. John believed that he did not have enough men to defend that frontier and petitioned the local government to allow him to take offensive actions against the native tribes. Paxton leadership struggled with the idea of allied Indian tribes and constantly insisted “the distinction between “friendly” and “enemy” Indians was invalid. All Indians were enemies and must be treated accordingly.” This anti-native ideology would influence all Paxton actions throughout its existence. 

The Susquehannock tribe which inhabited Conestoga Indiantown had lived on the land which William Penn ceded to their ancestors in the 1690s. Once the crossroads of diplomacy and trade, it was now in permanent decline. Many Conestoga were Christian, and they had lived peacefully with their European neighbors for decades. They lived by bartering handicrafts, hunting, and from subsistence food given to them by the Pennsylvania government. The Indians could not hunt for fear of being mistaken for an enemy by colonial forces. Will Sock, the prominent member of the tribe, became a target by the Paxton boys as they made unsubstantiated claims that the Conestoga secretly provided aid and intelligence to rebellious tribes. These claims came from a man named Mathew Smith, who, along with five companions, decided to investigate the Conestoga village. "Smith believed he could see dozens of strangers armed Indians in the little village and the six returned for help." John Elder sent a short message to the party to dissuade the coming violence, but it had little effect.

The massacre 
At daybreak on December 14, 1763, a vigilante group of fifty-seven Scots-Irish frontiersmen attacked homes in Conestoga Town (near present-day Millersville), murdered six, and burned their cabins. Fourteen of the Conestogas had been unable to reach home, having been away selling personal wares the previous evening, and spent the night with neighbors. After hearing of the murders, they fled to Lancaster town where the new governor, John Penn, offered them refuge in the local prisons.

The colonial government in the wake of the massacre held an inquest and determined that the killings were murder. The new governor, John Penn (William Penn’s grandson), offered a reward for the capture of the Paxton Boys. Penn placed the remaining fourteen-sixteen Conestoga in protective custody in Lancaster. Believing that one of the protected Indians was a murderer, the Paxton Boys rode to Lancaster, believing their job was only half done. John Elder himself appeared before the angry mob to try and restrain them, but to little effect. On December 27, 1763, under the leadership of Matthew Smith and Lazarus Stewart, a mob of Paxton Boys broke into the Lancaster prison. They killed, scalped, and dismembered six adults and eight children. The government of Pennsylvania offered a new reward after this second attack, this time 200 pounds (US$53,363 in 2022) for the capture of any of the ringleaders involved with the massacre. The attackers were never identified. Many of the residents of where they lived had sympathy towards the Paxton Boys and their efforts; therefore no prosecutions were put into action. There was a strong feeling among many of the Quakers that many of the law-keeping officials such as the sheriff, the coroners, and the magistrates were not fully cooperating with the government to bring the leaders of the massacre to justice. The Conestoga murders were meant to “convey a message”, not just to scare the Philadelphia provincial authorities, but also the local elites. Following these successful acts of violence, it was clear to the Paxton leaders that local authorities would struggle to respond to any escalations of violence in the future. 

Many colonists were outraged about the December killings of innocent Conestoga, describing the murders as more savage than those committed by Indians. Benjamin Franklin's "Narrative of the Late Massacres" concluded with noting that the Conestoga would have been safe among any other people on earth, no matter how primitive, except "'white savages' from Peckstang and Donegall!"

The Rev. Elder, who was not directly implicated in either attack, wrote to Governor Penn, on January 27, 1764:

March on Philadelphia 
In January 1764, the Paxton Boys marched toward Philadelphia with about 250 men to challenge the government for failing to protect them and with claims to kill the Indians settled on Provincial Island.  Due to the circulation of rumors, however, many Philadelphia citizens believed that the number of marchers could exceed far into the hundreds and possibly thousands. John Penn, still acting governor, begged the assembly to give him emergency military powers but was told that it would take too long to draft a bill in time. Penn instead began helping move many of the natives off of Provincial Island and moving them into New York. Lacking a militia, Penn summoned the people of Philadelphia and appointed Benjamin Franklin to oversee the arming of its people. A substantial minority of Quakers even took up arms to face the oncoming threat. In the end Franklin was able to make nine companies, six of infantry, one of artillery and two of cavalry. 

On February 5 news arrived claiming that the Paxton Boys had made it into Germantown, a village six miles northwest of Philadelphia. A resident of the town, David Rittenhouse, described the occupation "about fifty of the scoundrels marched by my work-shop— I have seen hundreds of Indians traveling the country, and can with truth affirm, that the behavior of these fellows was ten times more savage and brutal than theirs.” The Paxton Boys, he claimed, paraded through the streets, “frightening women, by running the muzzles of their guns through windows, swearing and hallooing: attacking men without the least provocation; dragging them by their hair to the ground, and pretending to scalp them; shooting a number of dogs and fowls.” After learning about the size of the force that was prepared to meet them in Philadelphia, the Paxton Boys decided to halt their march and remain in Germantown. Seeking an end to the situation, Penn appointed Benjamin Franklin to lead a group of civic leaders to meet them in Germantown, and hear their grievances. After the leaders agreed to read the men's pamphlet of issues before the colonial legislature, the mob agreed to disperse.

Black Boy disturbances 
The actions of the Conestoga Massacre inspired offshoots of the Paxton Boy gang such as the Black Boys to continue a guerilla war against Indian tribes. In March 1765 a group of vigilantes attacked a caravan moving goods from Philadelphia to Fort Pitt. The land that they were moving through, Sidling Hill, once belonged to squatters in 1750, but their eviction in 1755 had left the region a hotbed for anti-Indian sentiment. "The goods intercepted at Sideling Hill were being shipped by the Philadelphia firm of Baynton, Wharton, & Morgan for use in the Indian trade. These goods included 'blankets, shirts, vermillion, lead, beads, wampum, tomahawks, scalping knives,' and liquor."The attackers covered their faces in black material and hence became known as the Black Boys. Their leader, James Smith, had been captured by Delaware Indians and after his release started the group known as the Black Boys, where he sought to destroy relations between Natives and colonial powers.

Another attack followed in May on the trader Joseph Spears, who was transporting liquor to a local garrison. Suspecting that these supplies would be used for Indian trade, the Black Boys ambushed the traders and murdered their horses. When soldiers of the garrison went out to rescue the traders, they were fired upon as well. In the following months Black Boy activity would continue as they ambushed caravans and in one case laid siege to a fort. Much like in the case of the Paxton Boys, no Black Boys were never arrested for the crimes they committed.

Dissolution and legacy of the Paxton Boys 
Lazarus Stewart, a former leader of the Paxton Boys, was killed by Iroquois warriors in the Wyoming Massacre in 1778 during the American Revolutionary War. In the Wyoming Valley event, one of three famous massacres during many scattered Tory-Amerindian staged attacks on colonial settlements that year in Connecticut, New York and Pennsylvania, Mohawk chief Joseph Brant led a group of Loyalists, Mohawk and other warriors against rebel colonial settlers in the area along the North Branch Susquehanna River. The raids resulted in the Sullivan Expedition the next year, which effectively broke the power of the Six Nations of the Iroquois below Canada, and forced the British administration in Canada to shelter the Amerindians who fled from the devastation caused by the expedition.

Following the start of the Revolutionary War, what was left of the Paxton Boys leadership fell squarely with the patriots. Due to their experience with combat, many Paxton members were relied upon to train up other able-bodied men. As a result some Philadelphians moved north to join the loyalists to seek revenge against the Paxton Boys.

In fiction
Each of these books references the Paxton Boys:
The Light in the Forest (1953), by Conrad Richter.
Mason & Dixon (1997) by Thomas Pynchon, includes the Lancaster Massacre.
Robert J. Shade. Conestoga Winter: A Story of Border Vengeance (Forbes Road) (volume 2; 2013) includes the Lancaster Massacre.
Mindy Starns Clark and Leslie Gould. The Amish Seamstress (2013); the narrator finds out quite a bit about Amish involvement in the events of the time.
Ghost River: The Fall & Rise of the Conestoga, published by the Library Company of Philadelphia.

See also

 Black Boys
Enoch Brown school massacre (July 26, 1764)
 List of unsolved murders
 Paxtang
 Gnadenhutten massacre

Sources
 
 
 
 
 
 Taylor, Alan, American Colonies, New York: Viking Press, 2001.
 Engels, Jeremy. “‘Equipped for Murder’: The Paxton Boys and ‘the Spirit of Killing All Indians’ in Pennsylvania, 1763-1764.” Rhetoric and Public Affairs 8, no. 3 (2005): 355–81. http://www.jstor.org/stable/41939988.
 Judith Ridner “Unmasking the Paxton Boys: The Material Culture of the Pamphlet War.” Early American Studies 14, no. 2 (2016): 348–76. https://www.jstor.org/stable/earlamerstud.14.2.348
 Scott Paul, Gordon “The Paxton Boys and the Moravians: Terror and Faith in the Pennsylvania Backcountry.” Journal of Moravian History 14, no. 2 (2014): 119–52. https://doi.org/10.5325/jmorahist.14.2.0119.

References

External links
Digital Paxton, An Introduction to the 1764 Pamphlet Wars, Will Fenton
 "A Narrative of the Late Massacres...", Benjamin Franklin's account of the massacre and criticism of the Paxton Boys
 
Paxton Boys US History.com

1760s riots
1763 in Pennsylvania
1764 in Pennsylvania
Colonial people of Pontiac's War
History of Harrisburg, Pennsylvania
Massacres of Native Americans
Pre-statehood history of Pennsylvania
Rebellions in the United States
Scotch-Irish American culture in Pennsylvania